Dong Jimin (born October 10, 1983, in Gaoyou) is a male race walker from PR China. His personal best time is 1:18:45 hours, achieved in April 2006 in Yangzhou.

Achievements

References

2008 Team China

1983 births
Living people
Chinese male racewalkers
Athletes (track and field) at the 2008 Summer Olympics
Olympic athletes of China
Athletes from Jiangsu
Sportspeople from Yangzhou